James William Harris (born 15 April 1987) is an English professional footballer who plays as a midfielder for Warrington Town.

Career

Everton
Jay Harris started his career as a youth player with Everton, he became a senior player in 2006 but left Goodison Park.

Accrington Stanley
In the summer of 2006 Harris joined Accrington Stanley.
He made his full Accrington debut against Barnet on 12 August 2006. In May 2007 he signed a new two-year contract,
but at the end of the 2007–08 season, he was released by the club, together with ten other first-team players.

Chester City
On 25 June 2008, he joined Chester City on a two-year contract along with Accrington teammate David Mannix. He featured in more than 30 of Chester's games in 2008–09 as the club suffered relegation from the Football League. In February 2010 Chester were expelled from the Conference for breaching five league rules and so the club was liquidated leaving Harris without a club.

On 7 April 2009, Harris was one of five players charged with breaching Football Association rules on betting relating to the Accrington against Bury match on the final day of the 2007–08 season. He was later banned for twelve months and fined £5,500.

Wrexham
On 21 July 2010, he appeared as a triallist for Wrexham during a 0–0 draw against a young Liverpool side in a pre-season friendly just 24 hours after his ban expired, later signing a one-year contract with the club. On his arrival, Wrexham manager Dean Saunders commented "We know what happened with him before, he's been out of football for a year, so I'm going to give him a chance". He made his debut on the opening day of the 2010–11 season in a 1–0 win over Cambridge United. His good form at the start of 2011 led to him being named the Blue Square Bet Premier player of the month for January.
On 19 August Harris scored his first goal of the 2011–12 season against Lincoln City. Wrexham won the game 2–1 and went top of the Conference Premier. In January 2012 Harris signed a new deal to stay with Wrexham until the end of the 2012–13 season. Harris and Wrexham failed to gain promotion from the Conference but Harris remained at Wrexham ahead of the new season. Harris scored some major goals in the 2012/2013 season and on 25 February 2013 Harris signed an extension on his contract to run until the summer of 2015. Harris picked up his first piece of silverware in his career when he won the FA Trophy with Wrexham in March 2013.

Tranmere Rovers
Harris signed for Tranmere Rovers on 22 May 2015 on a free transfer after his contract with Wrexham expired. On 27 June 2019, Harris left the club after helping achieve back to back promotions with The Whites and being a very popular figure with fans.

Macclesfield Town
On 1 August 2019, Harris joined League Two side Macclesfield Town on a one-year deal.

Return to Wrexham
On 31 January 2020, Harris returned to Wrexham on an 18-month contract.

On 2 June 2021, it was announced Harris would not be offered a contract extension by Wrexham.

Warrington Town
On 29 August 2021, Harris signed for Warrington Town.

Career statistics

Honours
Wrexham
FA Trophy: 2012–13; runner-up: 2014–15

Tranmere Rovers
EFL League Two play-offs: 2019
National League play-offs: 2018

Individual
Conference Premier Team of the Year: 2012–13

References

External links

1987 births
Living people
Footballers from Liverpool
English footballers
Association football midfielders
Everton F.C. players
Accrington Stanley F.C. players
Chester City F.C. players
Wrexham A.F.C. players
Tranmere Rovers F.C. players
Macclesfield Town F.C. players
Warrington Town F.C. players
English Football League players
National League (English football) players
Northern Premier League players
Expatriate footballers in Sweden
English expatriate sportspeople in Sweden
Sportspeople involved in betting scandals